Rutherford County is a county in the southwestern area of the U.S. state of North Carolina. As of the 2020 census, the population was 64,444. Its county seat is Rutherfordton. 

Rutherford County comprises the Forest City, NC Micropolitan Statistical Area.

History
The county was formed in 1779 from the western part of the former Tryon County. It was named for Griffith Rutherford, leader of an expedition against the Cherokee in 1776 and a general in the American Revolutionary War.

In 1791 parts of Rutherford County and Burke County were combined to form Buncombe County. In 1841 parts of Rutherford and Lincoln counties were combined to form Cleveland County. In 1842 additional parts of Rutherford and Burke counties were combined to form McDowell County. Finally, in 1855, parts of Rutherford and Henderson counties were combined to form Polk County.

Geography

State and local protected areas 
 Bechtler Mint Site Historic Park
 Bradley Nature Preserve at Alexander's Ford (part)
 Chimney Rock State Park (part)
 Purple Martin Greenway Trail
 South Mountains Game Lands (part)
 South Mountains State Park (part)

Major water bodies 
 Broad River
 Catheys Creek
 Cedar Creek
 Duncans Creek
 Floyds Creek
 Hills Creek
 Hollands Creek
 Lake Lure
 McKinney Creek
 Mountain Creek
 North Fork First Broad Creek
 Roberson Creek
 Second Broad River

Adjacent counties
 McDowell County - north
 Burke County - northeast
 Cleveland County - east
 Cherokee County, South Carolina - south
 Spartanburg County, South Carolina - south
 Polk County - southwest
 Henderson County - west
 Buncombe County - northwest

Major highways

Major infrastructure 
 Rutherford County Airport (KFQD)
 Summey Airpark (8NC2), near Forest City

Demographics

2020 census

As of the 2020 United States census, there were 64,444 people, 27,970 households, and 18,874 families residing in the county.

2000 census
As of the census of 2000, the county had 62,899 people, 25,191 households, and 17,935 families. The population density was 112 people per square mile (43/km2). There were 29,535 housing units at an average density of 52 per square mile (20/km2). The county's racial makeup was 86.79% White, 11.23% Black or African American, 0.20% Native American, 0.22% Asian, 0.03% Pacific Islander, 0.67% from other races, and 0.74% from two or more races. 1.81% of the population were Hispanic or Latino of any race.

The largest ancestry groups in Rutherford County are:
 English - 44%
 Irish - 9%
 African American - 11%
 German - 5%
 Scotch-Irish - 4%
 Scottish - 3%
 Dutch - 2%
 Italian - 1%
 French or French Canadian (except Basque) - 1%
 Mexican - 1%
 Polish - 1%

There were 25,191 households, out of which 30.00% had children under the age of 18 living with them, 55.40% were married couples living together, 11.70% had a female householder with no husband present, and 28.80% were non-families. 25.50% of all households were made up of individuals, and 11.10% had someone living alone who was 65 years of age or older. The average household size was 2.44 and the average family size was 2.90.

In the county, the population was spread out, with 23.80% under the age of 18, 8.00% from 18 to 24, 27.90% from 25 to 44, 24.30% from 45 to 64, and 16.00% who were 65 years of age or older. The median age was 38 years. For every 100 females there were 93.00 males. For every 100 females age 18 and over, there were 89.60 males.

The county's median household income was $31,122, and the median family income was $37,787. Males had a median income of $28,890 versus $21,489 for females. The county's per capita income was $16,270. About 10.40% of families and 13.90% of the population were below the poverty line, including 18.30% of those under age 18 and 13.80% of those age 65 or over.

Government and politics
Rutherford is currently a powerfully Republican county. No Democratic presidential candidate has carried Rutherford County since Jimmy Carter did so in 1976. Before 1928 when Herbert Hoover won it, however, the county was a clear-cut part of the Democratic "Solid South".

Rutherford County is governed by a board of commissioners. The County Board of Commissioners includes: Chairman Bryan King, Com. Greg Lovelace, Com. David Hunt, Com. Michael Benfield, and Com. Alan Toney. The Board of Commissioners appoints a county manager to serve as the chief administrator. The current county manager is Steve Garrison who has been serving since March 16, 2015.

The county is policed by the Rutherford County Sheriff's Office (NC). The current sheriff is Aaron Ellenburg.

Economy
In 2010, Rutherford County was selected as the location for a new $450 million data center for Facebook.

Horsehead Corporation announced the construction of its new, state-of-the-art zinc and diversified metals production facility in Rutherford County, NC, near the municipality of Forest City.
 
Camp Bud Scheile A Boy Scout camp run by the Piedmont Council BSA is located North of Forest City. It can accommodate as many as 1800 campers every summer.

Communities

Towns
 Bostic
 Ellenboro
 Forest City (largest town)
 Lake Lure
 Ruth
 Rutherfordton (county seat)
 Spindale

Village
 Chimney Rock

Census-designated places
 Caroleen
 Cliffside
 Henrietta

Unincorporated communities
 Corinth
 Harris
 Hopewell
 Mount Vernon
 Union Mills
 Sandy Mush

Former community 
 Alexander Mills

Townships

 Camp Creek
 Chimney Rock
 Colfax
 Cool Spring
 Duncans Creek
 Gilkey
 Golden Valley
 Green Hill
 High Shoals
 Logan Store
 Morgan
 Rutherfordton
 Sulphur Springs
 Union

Notable people 
 Smoky Burgess, record-setting major league baseball player
 Bryan Coker, 12th President of Maryville College 
 Walter Dalton, former lieutenant governor of North Carolina (in office 2009–2013)
 Tim Earley, American poet
 Pleasant Daniel Gold (1833–1920), American publisher and clergyman
 Kay Hooper, best-selling author
 Robert McNair, Owner Houston Texans

See also
 List of counties in North Carolina
 National Register of Historic Places listings in Rutherford County, North Carolina
 North Carolina State Parks

References

External links

 
 
 Rutherford County Tourism Information
 NCGenWeb Rutherford County- free genealogy resources for the county
 Genealogical Society of Old Tryon County

 
1779 establishments in North Carolina
Populated places established in 1779
Counties of Appalachia